Winston Walls (January 5, 1943 Ironton, Ohio – February 5, 2008 Fort Myers, Florida) was an American jazz musician who played the Hammond B3 organ.

Career
His father was Harry Van Walls, who played piano for Big Joe Turner. He grew up in Charleston, West Virginia and played drums and piano in his teens.  He was hired by Bill Doggett as a drummer, but during breaks he replaced Doggett on organ and built his career as a keyboardist. He worked with George Benson, Lou Donaldson, Al Green, Brother Jack McDuff, Pointer Sisters, Charley Pride, Sonny Stitt, Ike & Tina Turner, and Dionne Warwick. Schoolkids Records released his first album, Boss of the B-3.

I had the opportunity to play in his group when he was in Denver in 1986. He billed himself as Dr. Who in those days. He kept the clubs jumpin'

References

American jazz organists
American male organists
American jazz singers
Soul-jazz organists
Hard bop organists
2008 deaths
American male jazz musicians
1943 births